Elias Kachunga (born 22 April 1992) is a professional footballer who plays for Bolton Wanderers as a forward. Born in Germany, Kachunga represents the DR Congo national team.

Early and personal life
Born in Haan, Germany, Kachunga has a Congolese father and a German mother.

Club career
Kachunga spent his early career in Germany with Borussia Mönchengladbach, VfL Osnabrück, Hertha BSC and SC Paderborn. Following Paderborn's relegation, he moved to FC Ingolstadt 04 in June 2015. He was the club's record signing, at a transfer fee of €1.7 million. He signed a season-long loan deal with an option to buy at the end with English Championship club Huddersfield Town in June 2016. He made his debut for them on 6 August 2016, scoring the first goal in a 2–1 win over Brentford. On 22 March 2017, Huddersfield paid Ingolstadt £1.1 million to turn Kachunga's loan deal into a permanent transfer.

In December 2017 he was ruled-out for three months due to injury.

He was released by Huddersfield at the end of the 2019–20 season.

On 2 September 2020, he was signed by Sheffield Wednesday on a free transfer. He made his debut coming off the bench against Cardiff City on the opening day of the season. He scored his first goal for Wednesday in a 2-0 EFL Cup win against Rochdale on 15 September 2020.

On 20 May 2021, it was announced that he would leave Sheffield Wednesday at the end of the season, following the expiry of his contract.

On 6 August 2021, he signed for Bolton Wanderers. He made his debut a day later as a late substitute against Milton Keynes Dons and provided an assist for Alex Baptiste in the 95th minute, rescuing a point for Bolton in a 3–3 draw. His first Bolton goal came on 7 November in a 2–2 draw against Stockport County in the FA Cup.

International career
Kachunga has represented Germany at all youth age levels from under-17 through to under-21.

He debuted for the senior DR Congo national team in a friendly 2–1 loss to Kenya on 26 March 2017.

Career statistics

Honours
Huddersfield Town
EFL Championship play-offs: 2017

References

External links

1992 births
Living people
People from Haan
Sportspeople from Düsseldorf (region)
Democratic Republic of the Congo people of German descent
German sportspeople of Democratic Republic of the Congo descent
Citizens of the Democratic Republic of the Congo through descent
Democratic Republic of the Congo footballers
German footballers
Footballers from North Rhine-Westphalia
Association football forwards
Democratic Republic of the Congo international footballers
Germany youth international footballers
Germany under-21 international footballers
Bundesliga players
2. Bundesliga players
3. Liga players
Premier League players
English Football League players
Borussia Mönchengladbach players
Borussia Mönchengladbach II players
VfL Osnabrück players
Hertha BSC II players
Hertha BSC players
SC Paderborn 07 players
FC Ingolstadt 04 players
Huddersfield Town A.F.C. players
Sheffield Wednesday F.C. players
Bolton Wanderers F.C. players
Democratic Republic of the Congo expatriate footballers
German expatriate footballers
Democratic Republic of the Congo expatriate sportspeople in England
German expatriate sportspeople in England
Expatriate footballers in England